Boone Creek (sometimes called Boones Creek) is a stream in the U.S. state of Missouri. It is a tributary of the Bourbeuse River. It runs through Crawford and Franklin Counties.

The stream flows north passing under Interstate 44 and then northeast past Bourbon then turns north and enters Franklin County.

Boone Creek bears the name of frontiersman Daniel Boone.

See also
List of rivers of Missouri

References

Rivers of Crawford County, Missouri
Rivers of Franklin County, Missouri
Rivers of Missouri